Andrew Lau Wai-keung (born 4 April 1960) is a Hong Kong film director, producer, and cinematographer. Lau began his career in the 1980s and 1990s, serving as a cinematographer to filmmakers such as Ringo Lam, Wong Jing and Wong Kar-wai.  In the 1990s, Lau decided to have more creative freedom as a cinematographer by becoming a film director and producer.  Apart from making films in his native Hong Kong, Lau has also made films in China, Korea and the United States. A highly prolific filmmaker, Lau has made films in a variety of genres, and is most notable in the West for his action and crime films which include the Young and Dangerous film series,  the Infernal Affairs trilogy (the latter co-directed together with Alan Mak), and Revenge of the Green Dragons (executive produced by Martin Scorsese).

Early life
Andrew Lau was born 4 April 1960, and is one of six siblings.  As a child, he was raised in the New Territories of Hong Kong. His father worked as a construction worker on Hong Kong Island.  Since his parents did not have time to concentrate on all of their children, Lau had developed an interest in photography.  Lau was also a Catholic, and would go to church every week, learning how to play a guitar.  As a child and high school student, Lau admits to not liking Hong Kong, since it was a British colony.

He currently has four children, three sons and a daughter.

Career
Lau joined Shaw Brothers Studios after graduating from secondary school.  He made his film debut as a semi-skilled cinematographer for Lau Kar-leung’s 1982 film, Legendary Weapons of China.  He later served as a cinematographer for Sammo Hung's 1986 martial arts film Millionaire's Express and Ringo Lam's 1987 crime thriller City on Fire, where he became known for his use of lighting and hand-held cinematography. His work on As Tears Go By (1988), the directorial debut of Wong Kar-wai, earned him his first Hong Kong Film Award nomination for Best Cinematography. He also shot the beginning portion of Wong Kar-wai's Chungking Express in 1994 (Christopher Doyle was cinematographer for the film's second half).

Filmmaking
Lau become a film director and producer on top of still being a cinematographer.  He made his directorial debut with the 1990 action film Against All.  Lau went on to make films for prolific filmmaker Wong Jing, including the 1993 Category III film Raped by an Angel and the 1994 film To Live and Die in Tsimshatsui. In 1996, Lau directed and photographed the 1996 film Young and Dangerous, a film centered on Hong Kong's Triad society. The film was a huge success in Hong Kong, but also gained controversy for its glorification of Triads. The film spawned a several sequels and spin-offs, in which Lau directed seven sequels and one prequel.  While filming the franchise, Lau teamed up with screenwriter Manfred Wong and film producer Wong Jing to establish BoB and Partners Co. Ltd., a company responsible for films made by the trio of filmmakers.  The trio's collaborations proved to be successful with films such as The Storm Riders, The Legend of Speed, and The Duel.

In 2002, Lau established Basic Pictures, a company responsible for the films in which he served as a producer and director. That year saw the success of Infernal Affairs a crime thriller that the largest ensemble cast of any Hong Kong film that year. Infernal Affairs became a huge box-office success in Hong Kong, even being deemed as a "box-office miracle" at a time when Hong Kong cinema was said to have been lacking in creativity. Infernal Affairs also marked the first of several collaborations with co-director Alan Mak, and screenwriter Felix Chong.  Other films made by the directors and screenwriter include the sequels to Infernal Affairs (Infernal Affairs II and Infernal Affairs III), Initial D and Confession of Pain.

In 2014, Lau directed an American action crime drama film Revenge of the Green Dragons, which was co-directed by Andrew Loo and executive produced by Martin Scorsese. The film has been screened at a number of international film festivals, and had also received a day-and-date theatrical and VOD release in the United States. In December 2014, Lau said that the film was able to make profit.

Other works
In 2007, Lau directed a five-minute short film, for Vision Beijing, a project of the Beijing Foreign Cultural Exchanges Association and the Information Office of the Beijing Municipal Government.  Lau's short film was centered on Beijing cuisine, and consisted of actors from China, Hong Kong and Taiwan serving as "ambassadors".  The cast included Tony Leung Chiu-Wai, Shu Qi, and Jay Chou, actors who had appeared in several of Lau's films.

In 2009, Lau directed an eight-minute commercial promoting the Acura TL luxury car. The commercial is divided into three stories and features Andy Lau as a wine manor and Gwei Lun-mei as an artist. Filming took place in San Francisco, California with an American production team.

Filmography

Director
Against All (1990)
The Ultimate Vampire (1991)
Rhythm of Destiny (1992)
Raped by an Angel (1993)
All New Human Skin Lanterns (1993)
Modern Romance (1994)
To Live and Die in Tsimshatsui (1994)
Lover of the Last Empress (1995)
The Mean Street Story (1995)
Young and Dangerous (1996)
Best of the Best (1996)
Young and Dangerous 2 (1996)
Young & Dangerous III (1996)
Young and Dangerous 4 (1997)
The Storm Riders (1998)
Young and Dangerous V (1998)
Young & Dangerous: The Prequel (1998)
The Legend of Speed (1999)
A Man Called Hero (1999)
Born to Be King (2000)
Sausalito (2000)
The Duel (2000)
Dance of a Dream (2001)
God of Fist Style a.k.a. Legend of Tekken (2001)
Bullets of Love (2001)
Infernal Affairs (2002) - co-directed with Alan Mak
Women from Mars (2002)
The Wesley's Mysterious File (2002)
Infernal Affairs II (2003) - co-directed with Alan Mak
Infernal Affairs III (2003) - co-directed with Alan Mak
Suicide Note on Dot Social (2003)
The Park (2003)
Initial D (2005) - co-directed with Alan Mak
Fox Volant of the Snowy Mountain (2006) - TV series
Confession of Pain (2006) - co-directed with Alan Mak
Daisy (2006)
The Flock (2007)
Look for a Star (2008)
Legend of the Fist: The Return of Chen Zhen (2010)
A Beautiful Life (2011)
The Guillotines (2012)
Revenge of the Green Dragons (2014)
From Vegas to Macau III (2016) - co-directed with Wong Jing
The Founding of an Army (2017)
Kung Fu Monster (2018)
The Captain (2019)
Chinese Doctors (2021)

Actor
 Little Cop (1989)
 Curry and Pepper (1990)
 Inspiration Nightmare (1992)
 Twin Dragons (1992)
 Growing Up (1996)
 Young and Dangerous 4 (1997)
 As the Light Goes Out (2014)
 Kung Fu Jungle (2014)

References

External links

1960 births
Living people
Hong Kong people of Hakka descent
Hong Kong cinematographers
Hong Kong film directors
Hong Kong film producers
Hong Kong film presenters
Alumni of Lingnan University (Hong Kong)
Hong Kong artists